The 9th constituency of the Bas-Rhin is a French legislative constituency in the Bas-Rhin département.

Description

The 9th constituency of Bas-Rhin covers the area north of Strasbourg around the large town of Haguenau.

In common with much of Alsace outside Strasbourg and Mulhouse the constituency has been held by conservative parties for all of the Fifth Republic. All three cantons that make up the constituency are currently held by the UMP.  The constituency was held by former Prime Minister of France Pierre Pflimlin during the 1950s & 1960s.

From 2012 until 2017 the seat was held by Claude Sturni, Mayor of Haguenau, having defeated the official UMP candidate in the second round of the 2012 election.

Historic Representation

Election results

2022

 
 
|-
| colspan="8" bgcolor="#E9E9E9"|
|-

2017

|- style="background-color:#E9E9E9;text-align:center;"
! colspan="2" rowspan="2" style="text-align:left;" | Candidate
! rowspan="2" colspan="2" style="text-align:left;" | Party
! colspan="2" | 1st round
! colspan="2" | 2nd round
|- style="background-color:#E9E9E9;text-align:center;"
! width="75" | Votes
! width="30" | %
! width="75" | Votes
! width="30" | %
|-
| style="background-color:" |
| style="text-align:left;" | Vincent Thiebaut
| style="text-align:left;" | La République En Marche!
| LREM
| 
| 35.98
| 
| 51.03
|-
| style="background-color:" |
| style="text-align:left;" | Etienne Wolf
| style="text-align:left;" | The Republicans
| LR
| 
| 23.25
| 
| 48.97
|-
| style="background-color:" |
| style="text-align:left;" | Laurent Gnaedig
| style="text-align:left;" | National Front
| FN
| 
| 13.86
| colspan="2" style="text-align:left;" |
|-
| style="background-color:" |
| style="text-align:left;" | Jean-Luc Leber
| style="text-align:left;" | Regionalist
| REG
| 
| 7.39
| colspan="2" style="text-align:left;" |
|-
| style="background-color:" |
| style="text-align:left;" | Leilla Witzmann
| style="text-align:left;" | La France Insoumise
| FI
| 
| 5.94
| colspan="2" style="text-align:left;" |
|-
| style="background-color:" |
| style="text-align:left;" | Vanessa Wagner
| style="text-align:left;" | Union of Democrats and Independents
| UDI
| 
| 4.31
| colspan="2" style="text-align:left;" |
|-
| style="background-color:" |
| style="text-align:left;" | Françoise Werckmann
| style="text-align:left;" | Ecologist
| ECO
| 
| 2.68
| colspan="2" style="text-align:left;" |
|-
| style="background-color:" |
| style="text-align:left;" | Guillaume Bosshardt
| style="text-align:left;" | Debout la France
| DLF
| 
| 1.73
| colspan="2" style="text-align:left;" |
|-
| style="background-color:" |
| style="text-align:left;" | Hamid Filali
| style="text-align:left;" | Socialist Party
| PS
| 
| 1.36
| colspan="2" style="text-align:left;" |
|-
| style="background-color:" |
| style="text-align:left;" | Emmanuelle Lang
| style="text-align:left;" | Far Right
| EXD
| 
| 0.88
| colspan="2" style="text-align:left;" |
|-
| style="background-color:" |
| style="text-align:left;" | Jean-Marc Claus
| style="text-align:left;" | Communist Party
| PCF
| 
| 0.55
| colspan="2" style="text-align:left;" |
|-
| style="background-color:" |
| style="text-align:left;" | Tezcan Can
| style="text-align:left;" | Independent
| DIV
| 
| 0.51
| colspan="2" style="text-align:left;" |
|-
| style="background-color:" |
| style="text-align:left;" | Emmanuel Goepp
| style="text-align:left;" | Independent
| DIV
| 
| 0.48
| colspan="2" style="text-align:left;" |
|-
| style="background-color:" |
| style="text-align:left;" | Annelyse Jacquel
| style="text-align:left;" | Far Left
| EXG
| 
| 0.41
| colspan="2" style="text-align:left;" |
|-
| style="background-color:" |
| style="text-align:left;" | David Poilevey
| style="text-align:left;" | Independent
| DIV
| 
| 0.39
| colspan="2" style="text-align:left;" |
|-
| style="background-color:" |
| style="text-align:left;" | Jean-Michel Delaye
| style="text-align:left;" | Far Left
| EXG
| 
| 0.29
| colspan="2" style="text-align:left;" |
|-
| colspan="8" style="background-color:#E9E9E9;"|
|- style="font-weight:bold"
| colspan="4" style="text-align:left;" | Total
| 
| 100%
| 
| 100%
|-
| colspan="8" style="background-color:#E9E9E9;"|
|-
| colspan="4" style="text-align:left;" | Registered voters
| 
| style="background-color:#E9E9E9;"|
| 
| style="background-color:#E9E9E9;"|
|-
| colspan="4" style="text-align:left;" | Blank/Void ballots
| 
| 1.74%
| 
| 6.58%
|-
| colspan="4" style="text-align:left;" | Turnout
| 
| 44.99%
| 
| 38.93%
|-
| colspan="4" style="text-align:left;" | Abstentions
| 
| 55.01%
| 
| 61.07%
|-
| colspan="8" style="background-color:#E9E9E9;"|
|- style="font-weight:bold"
| colspan="6" style="text-align:left;" | Result
| colspan="2" style="background-color:" | LREM GAIN FROM DVD
|}

2012

|- style="background-color:#E9E9E9;text-align:center;"
! colspan="2" rowspan="2" style="text-align:left;" | Candidate
! rowspan="2" colspan="2" style="text-align:left;" | Party
! colspan="2" | 1st round
! colspan="2" | 2nd round
|- style="background-color:#E9E9E9;text-align:center;"
! width="75" | Votes
! width="30" | %
! width="75" | Votes
! width="30" | %
|-
| style="background-color:" |
| style="text-align:left;" | Claude Sturni
| style="text-align:left;" | Miscellaneous Right
| DVD
| 
| 29.86
| 
| 60.57
|-
| style="background-color:" |
| style="text-align:left;" | Nicole Thomas
| style="text-align:left;" | Union for a Popular Movement
| UMP
| 
| 25.32
| 
| 39.43
|-
| style="background-color:" |
| style="text-align:left;" | Clarisse Chabod
| style="text-align:left;" | Socialist Party
| PS
| 
| 19.56
| colspan="2" style="text-align:left;" |
|-
| style="background-color:" |
| style="text-align:left;" | Jean-Claude Altherr
| style="text-align:left;" | National Front
| FN
| 
| 17.94
| colspan="2" style="text-align:left;" |
|-
| style="background-color:" |
| style="text-align:left;" | Françoise Werckmann
| style="text-align:left;" | Ecologist
| ECO
| 
| 2.58
| colspan="2" style="text-align:left;" |
|-
| style="background-color:" |
| style="text-align:left;" | Jean-Marc Claus
| style="text-align:left;" | Left Front
| FG
| 
| 1.89
| colspan="2" style="text-align:left;" |
|-
| style="background-color:" |
| style="text-align:left;" | François Ludwig
| style="text-align:left;" | Other
| AUT
| 
| 0.99
| colspan="2" style="text-align:left;" |
|-
| style="background-color:" |
| style="text-align:left;" | Arnaud Markert
| style="text-align:left;" | Miscellaneous Right
| DVD
| 
| 0.95
| colspan="2" style="text-align:left;" |
|-
| style="background-color:" |
| style="text-align:left;" | Jean-Michel Delaye
| style="text-align:left;" | Far Left
| EXG
| 
| 0.49
| colspan="2" style="text-align:left;" |
|-
| style="background-color:" |
| style="text-align:left;" | Georges Dizdarevic
| style="text-align:left;" | Far Left
| EXG
| 
| 0.26
| colspan="2" style="text-align:left;" |
|-
| style="background-color:" |
| style="text-align:left;" | Mounir Diari
| style="text-align:left;" | Other
| AUT
| 
| 0.16
| colspan="2" style="text-align:left;" |
|-
| colspan="8" style="background-color:#E9E9E9;"|
|- style="font-weight:bold"
| colspan="4" style="text-align:left;" | Total
| 
| 100%
| 
| 100%
|-
| colspan="8" style="background-color:#E9E9E9;"|
|-
| colspan="4" style="text-align:left;" | Registered voters
| 
| style="background-color:#E9E9E9;"|
| 
| style="background-color:#E9E9E9;"|
|-
| colspan="4" style="text-align:left;" | Blank/Void ballots
| 
| 1.45%
| 
| 8.27%
|-
| colspan="4" style="text-align:left;" | Turnout
| 
| 54.02%
| 
| 43.83%
|-
| colspan="4" style="text-align:left;" | Abstentions
| 
| 45.98%
| 
| 56.17%
|-
| colspan="8" style="background-color:#E9E9E9;"|
|- style="font-weight:bold"
| colspan="6" style="text-align:left;" | Result
| colspan="2" style="background-color:" | DVD GAIN FROM UMP
|}

2007
François Loos was elected with more than 50% of the vote in the first round of voting, and therefore no second round took place.

|- style="background-color:#E9E9E9;text-align:center;"
! colspan="2" rowspan="2" style="text-align:left;" | Candidate
! rowspan="2" colspan="2" style="text-align:left;" | Party
! colspan="2" | 1st round
|- style="background-color:#E9E9E9;text-align:center;"
! width="75" | Votes
! width="30" | %
|-
| style="background-color:" |
| style="text-align:left;" | François Loos
| style="text-align:left;" | Union for a Popular Movement
| UMP
| 
| 56.55
|-
| style="background-color:" |
| style="text-align:left;" | Claude Kern
| style="text-align:left;" | UDF-Democratic Movement
| UDF-MoDem
| 
| 19.17
|-
| style="background-color:" |
| style="text-align:left;" | Leilla Witzmann
| style="text-align:left;" | Socialist Party
| PS
| 
| 8.26
|-
| style="background-color:" |
| style="text-align:left;" | Jean-Claude Altherr
| style="text-align:left;" | National Front
| FN
| 
| 6.28
|-
| style="background-color:" |
| style="text-align:left;" | Robert Lindeckert
| style="text-align:left;" | The Greens
| LV
| 
| 3.25
|-
| style="background-color:" |
| style="text-align:left;" | Marion Greib
| style="text-align:left;" | Far Left
| EXG
| 
| 1.78
|-
| style="background-color:" |
| style="text-align:left;" | Christian Weinzorn
| style="text-align:left;" | Ecologist
| ECO
| 
| 1.16
|-
| style="background-color:" |
| style="text-align:left;" | Jérôme Feuerstein
| style="text-align:left;" | Movement for France
| MPF
| 
| 0.91
|-
| style="background-color:" |
| style="text-align:left;" | Christian Fischer
| style="text-align:left;" | Far Right
| EXD
| 
| 0.86
|-
| style="background-color:" |
| style="text-align:left;" | Lydia Landeshaupt
| style="text-align:left;" | Independent
| DIV
| 
| 0.82
|-
| style="background-color:" |
| style="text-align:left;" | Georges Dizdarevic
| style="text-align:left;" | Far Left
| EXG
| 
| 0.71
|-
| style="background-color:" |
| style="text-align:left;" | Benoît Meyer
| style="text-align:left;" | Independent
| DIV
| 
| 0.24
|-
| colspan="6" style="background-color:#E9E9E9;"|
|- style="font-weight:bold"
| colspan="4" style="text-align:left;" | Total
| 
| 100%
|-
| colspan="6" style="background-color:#E9E9E9;"|
|-
| colspan="4" style="text-align:left;" | Registered voters
| 
| style="background-color:#E9E9E9;"|
|-
| colspan="4" style="text-align:left;" | Blank/Void ballots
| 
| 1.93%
|-
| colspan="4" style="text-align:left;" | Turnout
| 
| 55.26%
|-
| colspan="4" style="text-align:left;" | Abstentions
| 
| 44.74%
|-
| colspan="6" style="background-color:#E9E9E9;"|
|- style="font-weight:bold"
| colspan="4" style="text-align:left;" | Result
| colspan="2" style="background-color:" | UMP HOLD
|}

2002

|- style="background-color:#E9E9E9;text-align:center;"
! colspan="2" rowspan="2" style="text-align:left;" | Candidate
! rowspan="2" colspan="2" style="text-align:left;" | Party
! colspan="2" | 1st round
! colspan="2" | 2nd round
|- style="background-color:#E9E9E9;text-align:center;"
! width="75" | Votes
! width="30" | %
! width="75" | Votes
! width="30" | %
|-
| style="background-color:" |
| style="text-align:left;" | Bernard Schreiner
| style="text-align:left;" | Union for a Presidential Majority
| UMP
| 
| 43.58
| 
| 77.37
|-
| style="background-color:" |
| style="text-align:left;" | J. Claude Altherr
| style="text-align:left;" | National Front
| FN
| 
| 14.18
| 
| 22.63
|-
| style="background-color:" |
| style="text-align:left;" | Claude Kern
| style="text-align:left;" | Union for French Democracy
| UDF
| 
| 13.45
| colspan="2" style="text-align:left;" |
|-
| style="background-color:" |
| style="text-align:left;" | Leilla Witzmann
| style="text-align:left;" | Socialist Party
| PS
| 
| 9.19
| colspan="2" style="text-align:left;" |
|-
| style="background-color:" |
| style="text-align:left;" | Denis Garcia
| style="text-align:left;" | Miscellaneous Left
| DVG
| 
| 4.33
| colspan="2" style="text-align:left;" |
|-
| style="background-color:" |
| style="text-align:left;" | Isabelle Jensen
| style="text-align:left;" | The Greens
| LV
| 
| 3.81
| colspan="2" style="text-align:left;" |
|-
| style="background-color:" |
| style="text-align:left;" | Michele Leiser
| style="text-align:left;" | National Republican Movement
| MNR
| 
| 2.89
| colspan="2" style="text-align:left;" |
|-
| style="background-color:" |
| style="text-align:left;" | Sylvie Freysz
| style="text-align:left;" | Independent
| DIV
| 
| 2.63
| colspan="2" style="text-align:left;" |
|-
| style="background-color:" |
| style="text-align:left;" | J. Daniel Gillig
| style="text-align:left;" | Republican Pole
| PR
| 
| 1.57
| colspan="2" style="text-align:left;" |
|-
| style="background-color:" |
| style="text-align:left;" | Marc Baud-Berthier
| style="text-align:left;" | Workers’ Struggle
| LO
| 
| 1.06
| colspan="2" style="text-align:left;" |
|-
| style="background-color:" |
| style="text-align:left;" | Catherine Bitterlin
| style="text-align:left;" | Ecologist
| ECO
| 
| 0.77
| colspan="2" style="text-align:left;" |
|-
| style="background-color:" |
| style="text-align:left;" | Jocelyne Blanchard
| style="text-align:left;" | Movement for France
| MPF
| 
| 0.76
| colspan="2" style="text-align:left;" |
|-
| style="background-color:" |
| style="text-align:left;" | Murat Gunay
| style="text-align:left;" | Communist Party
| PCF
| 
| 0.67
| colspan="2" style="text-align:left;" |
|-
| style="background-color:" |
| style="text-align:left;" | Damien Bresse-Falk
| style="text-align:left;" | Regionalist
| REG
| 
| 0.63
| colspan="2" style="text-align:left;" |
|-
| style="background-color:" |
| style="text-align:left;" | Gil Neumann
| style="text-align:left;" | Independent
| DIV
| 
| 0.27
| colspan="2" style="text-align:left;" |
|-
| style="background-color:" |
| style="text-align:left;" | J. Benoit Meyer
| style="text-align:left;" | Independent
| DIV
| 
| 0.22
| colspan="2" style="text-align:left;" |
|-
| colspan="8" style="background-color:#E9E9E9;"|
|- style="font-weight:bold"
| colspan="4" style="text-align:left;" | Total
| 
| 100%
| 
| 100%
|-
| colspan="8" style="background-color:#E9E9E9;"|
|-
| colspan="4" style="text-align:left;" | Registered voters
| 
| style="background-color:#E9E9E9;"|
| 
| style="background-color:#E9E9E9;"|
|-
| colspan="4" style="text-align:left;" | Blank/Void ballots
| 
| 2.34%
| 
| 6.65%
|-
| colspan="4" style="text-align:left;" | Turnout
| 
| 57.78%
| 
| 46.98%
|-
| colspan="4" style="text-align:left;" | Abstentions
| 
| 42.22%
| 
| 53.02%
|-
| colspan="8" style="background-color:#E9E9E9;"|
|- style="font-weight:bold"
| colspan="6" style="text-align:left;" | Result
| colspan="2" style="background-color:" | UMP GAIN FROM RPR
|}

Sources

Official results of French elections from 2002: "Résultats électoraux officiels en France" (in French).

9